Germano is a given name and a surname. Notable people with the name include:

Mononym 
Germano (footballer, born 1911), Germano Boettcher Sobrinho (1911–1977), Brazilian goalkeeper
Germano (footballer, born 1942), José Germano de Sales (1942–1997), Brazilian left winger
Germano (footballer, born 1981), Germano Borovicz Cardozo Schweger, Brazilian defensive midfielder

Given name 
Germano Almeida (born 1945), Cape Verdean author and lawyer
Germano Celant (born 1940), Italian art historian, critic and curator
Germano de Figueiredo (1932–2004), Portuguese footballer
Germano Grachane (born 1942), Mozambican clergyman
Germano Mosconi (1932–2012), Italian sportswriter, news presenter and television personality
Germano Rigotto (born 1949), Brazilian politician
Germano Rocha, Portuguese-born Canadian fado singer and restaurant owner
Germano Vailati (born 1980), Swiss footballer

Surname 
Carlos Germano (born 1970), Brazilian footballer
David Germano, American Tibetologist
Eddie Germano (born 1924), American cartoonist
Elio Germano (born 1980), Italian actor
Isabelle M. Germano, American neurosurgeon
Jonatan Germano (born 1988), Argentine-Australian footballer
Justin Germano (born 1982), American baseball player
Lisa Germano (born 1958), American singer-songwriter
Peter B. Germano (1913–1983), American author
Umberto Germano (born 1992), Italian footballer

Italian masculine given names
Portuguese masculine given names